"Dona Dona", popularly known as "Donna, Donna", is a song about a calf being led to slaughter, written by Sholom Secunda and Aaron Zeitlin. Originally a Yiddish language song "Dana Dana" (in Yiddish דאַנאַ דאַנאַ), also known as "Dos Kelbl" (in Yiddish דאָס קעלבל, meaning The Calf), it was a song used in a Yiddish play produced by Zeitlin.

History
"Dana Dana" was written for the Aaron Zeitlin stage production Esterke (1940–41) with music composed by Sholom Secunda. The lyrics, score, parts, and associated material are available online in the Yiddish Theater Digital Archives. The lyric sheet is in typewritten Yiddish and handwritten Yiddish lyrics also appear in the piano score. The text underlay in the score and parts is otherwise romanized in a phonetic transcription that appears oriented toward stage German. The YIVO standardized transliteration system was not then in widespread use, and many Yiddish transliterations looked like German, to which the Yiddish language is closely related.

The orchestra plays the "Dana Dana" melody at several points in Esterke. The original is 2/4, in G minor for a duo of a man and a woman, choral with the orchestral accompaniment. Secunda wrote "Dana-" for the orchestral score and "Dana Dana" for the vocal scores. The Yiddish text was written with Roman alphabet. He wrote for the choral score "andantino" (somewhat slowly) and "sempre staccato" (play staccato always). The melody of the introduction was also used at the end of the song. He wrote "piu mosso" (more rapidly) for the refrain and some passages that emphasize the winds. First, a woman (Secunda wrote "she") sings four bars and then the man (Secunda wrote "he") sings the next four. They sing together from the refrain. Although singing the third part of "Dana Dana" (= "Dana Dana Dana Dana …"), the man sometimes sings lower than the melody using disjunct motions. The melody is refrained. Then "he" sings the melody, and "she" sometimes sings "Dana", other times sings "Ah" with a high voice or technical passage. Secunda wrote "molto rit." (suddenly much more slowly) for the ending of the first verse. There are some differences between the original and the melody that are well known. Secunda wrote "ha ha ha" for the choral score with the broken chords.

There are various views as to the meaning of the words 'Dana, dana' in the original Yiddish version of the song, repeated sixteen times in each chorus. The words 'dana, dana' are a common refrain in Polish folk song, heard often in formulas such as 'Oj, dana dana, moja dana'. Some believe it to be a nonsense word, but it may have earlier ritual origins in Polish song or be imitative of musical instruments. Zeitlin, who spent most of his life in the Polish-speaking world before emigrating to the U.S. in 1939, likely took the 'dana' refrain from this source. A comment appearing in the Hebrew newspaper Haaretz gives the meaning of Dana as the sound that was commonly made by the guide of a horse-drawn cart to encourage the horse to continue to step forward as it drags its heavy load. According to the comment in Haaretz, the translation of the word Dana (from Yiddish to Hebrew) was provided by Kol Israel in 1962, when the song was performed by Nechama Hendel. In the John Camden Hotten Slang Dictionary, the word Dana related to a nightman's or dustman's cart in old German or Austrian slang. Incidentally, in Turkish, Azerbaijani and other Turkic languages, "dana" means a "weaned calf".

Lyrics

Versions

English covers
Ola & the Janglers version

Swedish band Ola & the Janglers covered it in 1966, originally having heard the version by Kodesh & Schwartz. Unlike many artists that had previously covered "Donna, Donna", the Janglers were not known as folk artists, and had previously only released rock songs. Owing to this, they slightly changed the arrangement of the song, to better fit the group. They added a harpsichord part played by group keyboardist Johannes Olsson along with bass guitar by Åke Eldsäter. Though drummer Leif Johansson was left out, a harmony part by Ola Håkansson, Claes af Geijerstam and Eldsäter was added during the chorus. The group recorded it and the B-side "Come and Stay with Me" during a session in 1966, with their regular producer Gunnar Bergström present.

Initially intended to mark the introduction of guitarist af Geijerstam, who had recently replaced Christer Idering, "Donna, Donna" was chosen as the A-side of the single. However, during the time the single sleeves with "Donna, Donna" as the A-side were being printed, Pye Records released Donovan's version of the song as a single in Sweden. Fearing that the two singles would compete, their record label Gazell decided to switch the running order, with "Come and Stay With Me" becoming the A-side once the 7-inch single was being pressed. This meant that the sleeve and single had contrasting A-sides, which led to confusion by some of their fans and several radio stations, who were unaware of what side to plug.

"Come and Stay With Me" managed to reach number 13 on Kvällstoppen and number three on Tio i Topp in April 1966. "Donna, Donna" was still specifically asked about in record stores, which led to it gaining a chart position on Kvällstoppen as well. It entered on April 12, 1966 at a position of number 19, and was last seen on April 19 at the same position, coincidentally the same date "Come and Stay With Me" entered the chart. This led to the Janglers having three singles simultaneously during this date; "Love Was On Your Mind", "Donna, Donna" and "Come and Stay With Me".

Both sides of the single were among the first attempts at a Swedish rock band releasing a song in a folk rock vein. It was originally included on their second studio album Patterns, released in June of that year. It has since become a staple on most of their compilation albums, including Best Sounds (1969) and Ola & the Janglers, 1964–71!

Charts

Other English covers
 Secunda translated "Dana Dana" into English language (changing the vocalization of 'dana' to 'dona'), but this version didn't gain much attention.
 The lyrics were translated once again in the mid-1950s, this time by Arthur Kevess and Teddi Schwartz. This version became especially popular after being recorded in 1960 by Joan Baez for her debut album Joan Baez. On the album, the song is retitled "Donna, Donna", doubling the "n" while retaining the long "o" pronunciation. A staple for Baez, "Donna, Donna" was used throughout the civil rights protest movement of the 1960s.
 Very soon after the Claude François version, the Scottish singer-songwriter Donovan recorded another very popular cover of Baez' version in 1965. The track appeared on his album What's Bin Did and What's Bin Hid. The title is also "Donna, Donna", thus reinforcing further the popular "Donna" rather than the original transliteration "Dona".
 Also in 1965 Dana Gillespie released it for a single on Pye Records, produced by Jimmy Page.
 English duo Chad & Jeremy (Chad Stuart and Jeremy Clyde) covered it on their January 1965 US album Sing For You on World Artists Records. It was a B-side to their single "If I Loved You" which reached number 23 on the Billboard Hot 100. It was also included on their 1966 US album More Chad & Jeremy on Capitol Records.

French covers

Claude François cover

In 1964, the song was recorded in French language by French singer Claude François as "Donna, Donna" reaching the top of the French Singles Charts for two consecutive weeks in December 1964. François co-wrote the French lyrics with Vline Buggy. The song also known by its longer title "Donna, Donna (Le Petit Garçon)" is a completely revamped version lyricwise, as it no longer describes a helpless calf being led to its slaughter, as in the original Yiddish version, but is rather about the troubles of an aspiring young boy growing up dreaming about his own future. In the last verse, in an autobiographical twist, Claude François alludes to himself by singing the verse as "ce petit garçon que j'étais" (this small boy that I was...).

Other French covers

 In 1998, the French boyband C4 released a French dance version as "Donna, Donna" (YouTube video) on Polygram having a minor hit on French Singles Charts reaching number 25 and staying 12 weeks on the chart.

Other versions
 "Dana Dana" has been translated from Yiddish into Hebrew as "Lama Dona" and interpreted by Rika Zaraï. Zaraï went on also to launch a French oriental dance version in her album Hava.
 The song was recorded in many other languages as well including German, Swedish, Japanese, Russian, Italian, Catalan and Vietnamese. In Vietnamese language, the lyrics was translated metaphorically from French version by Trần Tiến, a well-known musician in Vietnam. This version was performed by a girlband name Tam Ca Áo Trắng (Trio of schoolgirls). There is also a less popular Vietnamese version called "Tiếc thương" (Mourning) that expresses the mourning of a man whose lover died at the young age. A version in Japanese is included in episode 16 of 1997 tv anime series Revolutionary Girl Utena.

References

External links
 Secunda's typed Yiddish lyrics 
 Secunda's handwritten romanized transcription (which differs here and there from the Yiddish lyric sheet) together with the music on several of the documents 

Jewish folk songs
Yiddish-language songs
Songs with music by Sholom Secunda
1941 songs
Joan Baez songs
1960 singles
Esther & Abi Ofarim songs